The American Parliamentary Debate Association (APDA) is the oldest intercollegiate parliamentary debating association in the United States.  APDA sponsors over 50 tournaments a year, all in a parliamentary format, as well as a national championship in late April.  It also administers the North American Debating Championship with the Canadian University Society for Intercollegiate Debate (CUSID) every year in January. Although it is mainly funded by its member universities, APDA is an entirely student-run organization.

Organizational structure
APDA comprises about 80 universities, mainly in the Northeastern United States, ranging as far north as Maine and as far south as North Carolina. APDA includes both private and public colleges and universities.

APDA members stage weekly debating tournaments, each at a different university and occurring throughout the academic year.  Most weekends have two or three debating tournaments: at least one will be north of New York City and south of New York City, in order to shorten transport time.  However, centrally located tournaments or historically large tournaments, such as Princeton, Rutgers, and Harvard, will be “unopposed”, meaning that they will be the only tournament on that particular weekend. Individual schools must ensure that their tournaments meet a broad set of APDA guidelines, but are free to tinker with their tournament formats.

There are a number of tournaments in which APDA plays a direct role.  Most prominently, APDA sponsors a national championship at the end of each year.  Unlike all other tournaments, debating at Nationals is limited to one team per university, plus any additional teams who “qualified” for Nationals during that debate season.  There are several ways to qualify for Nationals: The most common through the 2006–2007 season was to reach the final round of a tournament.  Starting with the 2007–2008 season, qualification was earned through year-long performance, gauged by how far debaters advance at tournaments of varying sizes.

In addition, APDA sponsors a novice tournament at the beginning of the season, a pro-am tournament once per semester, and the North American Debating Championships, which are held every other year in the United States and include top teams from the United States and Canada.

APDA also has a ranking system which combines the results of all of the year's tournaments.  Both individual speakers and two-member teams can earn points based on the results of the tournament; these points also scale up depending on the tournament's size.  At the end of the debate season, APDA gives awards to the top ten teams, speakers, and novices of the year.

APDA is an entirely student-run organization.  The APDA board members are students from various host institutions, and most of the tournaments are completely organized by the host school's debate team.  Some teams do have professional coaches, but these are usually recently retired debaters who wish to stay involved with the circuit.

Tournaments
Weekly debating tournaments are the core of APDA.  While numerous schools slightly alter the tournament format, the general format is fairly constant.  Tournaments usually start on Friday afternoon and end on Saturday evening.  Five preliminary rounds are held, three on Friday and two on Saturday. The first round is randomly paired, while remaining rounds are bracketed, meaning that teams with the same record face each other.  Preliminary rounds generally have only one judge, most frequently a debater from the host school.  After five rounds, the “break” is announced, consisting of the top eight teams at the tournament.  These teams compete in single-elimination quarterfinals, semifinals, and finals, judged by progressively larger panels of judges, and a tournament winner is crowned. Separate semifinals and then finals are held on the basis of the previous five rounds for the top novice team. Trophies are awarded to the top speakers, top teams, and top novice (first-year) debaters.  Certain tournaments tinker with the format, having more or fewer preliminary rounds and larger or smaller breaks; the national championships, for instance, generally have one additional preliminary round and one additional elimination round.

Format
Debates at APDA tournaments follow a debating style known as American Parliamentary Debate, which is modeled loosely on the procedure and decorum of the UK Parliament. This style emphasizes argumentation and rhetoric, rather than research and detailed factual knowledge.

Flow of the round
A round of debate features two teams of two debaters each: the Government team, including the Prime Minister and the Member of Government, and the Opposition team, including the Leader of the Opposition and the Member of the Opposition.

Six speeches in all are delivered, varying in length:
 Prime Minister's Constructive: 7 minutes, 30 seconds
 Leader of the Opposition's Constructive: 8 minutes, 30 seconds
 Member of Government: 8 minutes, 30 seconds
 Member of the Opposition: 8 minutes, 30 seconds
 Leader of the Opposition's Rebuttal: 4 minutes, 30 seconds
 Prime Minister's Rebuttal: 5 minutes, 30 seconds

Points of information
A debater may rise to ask a point of information (POI) of an opponent during the opponent's speech. POIs are only permitted during the first four speeches, though prohibited in the first and final minutes of each speech. The speaking debater can choose to hear the POI or to dismiss it politely. Traditionally when standing on a point of information some debaters extend one hand palm up, holding the back of the head with the other. This pose originated in old British Parliamentary etiquette: an MP would adopt the position to secure his wig and show that he was not carrying a weapon.
It is generally considered good form to accept at least one POI during a speech.

Resolutions
In most rounds, there is no resolution, and the Government team may propose whatever case it wishes consistent with the standards below.  Certain tournaments provide both teams with a motion to which the case must conform 15 minutes before the round starts.

Since the Opposition team arrives at the round with no prior knowledge of the case, some kinds of resolutions are not permitted to ensure a fair debate. If Opposition feels that the round fits any one of these categories, they may point this out during the Leader's speech. If the judge agrees, Opposition wins. There are five kinds of disallowed resolutions:
 tight resolutions, which are deemed too one-sided (“racism is bad”, for example);
 truisms (“Barack Obama was the greatest Democratic president of the U.S. since Bill Clinton”);
 tautologies (“Good citizens should help the poor,” with goodness defined as "a willingness to do charitable acts");
 status quo resolutions (“The United States should have jury trials”);
 specific-knowledge cases, i.e., cases which are unfair toward the Opposition team because they require highly obscure knowledge to oppose effectively ("NASA should replace the current sealant used on the space shuttle with hypoxynucleotide-C4598")

Aside from these five limitations, virtually any topic for debate is fair game, as long as there are two coherent and debatable sides.  Debaters may also present opp-choice cases, in which the government team offers the opposition team the chance to choose which side of a topic the government team will defend in the round.

Adjudication
A judge listens to the round and provides quantitative and qualitative assessments of the round as a whole and of the individual speakers. Some rounds use a panel of judges. Judges are usually debaters themselves, but non-debater judges, or lay judges, are sometimes used.

Comparison to other styles
The APDA style is generally seen as occupying a middle ground between the styles of
CUSID and NPDA.  It is somewhat more rule-oriented and structured than the CUSID style, as point-by-point argumentation and careful structure are considered very important.  It also emphasizes detailed analysis and de-emphasizes oratory as compared to CUSID. However, APDA style is less structured and theoretical than the NPDA style, and demands less use of technical debate formalisms.

Types of cases
APDA's format allows for an enormous variety of cases.  This list is not comprehensive, but should be treated as a general sketch of the case climate.

Public policy
Cases about public policy are among the most common cases on APDA.  They include common public policy debates (school vouchers, term limits, euthanasia, capital punishment, race-based affirmative action) as well as more unconventional ideas (mandatory organ donation, proxy voting for children, private criminal prosecution, and innumerable others). Libertarian policy proposals, such as abolishing the minimum wage or abolishing paternalistic laws, are particularly popular.  Cases involving the policies of particular organizations are popular as well, such as debates surrounding university speech codes.  Additionally, broad social questions can be discussed without centering the case around a government actor; “Are trade unions, all things considered, a good thing for society?” is a perfectly acceptable opp-choice debate case.

Political theory
Abstract questions about political philosophy are also popular topics of debate.
Cases about the relative benefits of the Rawlsian “veil of ignorance” versus the Hobbesian “state of nature”, for instance, are commonplace.  These rounds will generally be folded into moral hypotheticals; for instance, rather than a team actually proposing that the veil of ignorance is a worthwhile political theory, a team might argue that economic human rights should be included in constitutions, and use the veil of ignorance as a justification.

Law and legal theory
All aspects of law are fair game on APDA, including constitutional law (e.g. whether a Supreme Court case was wrongly decided), procedural law (e.g. whether standards of proof should differ for criminal and civil law) and abstract legal theory (e.g. whether retributive justice is a moral justification for the criminal justice system).

Foreign policy
Many aspects of American and international foreign policy make for excellent debate rounds.  Various aspects of policy related to Iraq, Israel, North Korea, and Cuba are frequent debate topics.

Moral hypotheticals
Hypothetical moral dilemmas are popular topics for debate, given that they can be discussed with a minimum of specific knowledge and a maximum of argumentation.  They can range from completely fantastical situations (“If you had definitive proof that one particular religion was the true religion, should you reveal it to society?”) to unlikely occurrences (“Should you kill one person to save five other people?”) to dilemmas we face every day (“You see a homeless person on the street, should you give him money you have in your pocket?”)  The infinite number of hypothetical situations that can give rise to moral dilemmas make many moral hypothetical cases unique.

Abstract philosophy 
Although somewhat less common than tangible moral hypotheticals, all aspects of philosophy make their way into debate rounds.  Ethics is probably the most debated field of philosophy, including both abstract metaethics and modern ethical problems like the trolley problem.  However, philosophy of religion (“Is it rational to be an atheist?”), philosophy of mind (“Can a computer have mental states?”) and even philosophy of language (“Does love result from appreciation of someone’s properties, or does appreciation of someone’s properties result from love?”) can result in excellent rounds.

Time-space 
One type of case, common on APDA but rare on other circuits, is the time-space case.  This places the speaker in the position of some real-life, fictional, or historical figure.  Only information accessible to a person in that position is legal in this type of round.  For instance, “You are Socrates.  Don’t commit suicide” could not reference events that took place after Socrates’ death.  The speaker can be a fictional character (“You are Homer Simpson.  Do not sell your soul”), a historical character (“You are Abraham Lincoln.  Do not sign the emancipation proclamation”) or virtually any other sentient individual.

One notable type of time-space case is the historical hypothetical case, in which decisions made by particular historical figures are debated from their historical context.  Debates surrounding, for instance, Civil War strategy or World War I alliances are commonplace.  These types of debates often require a detailed knowledge of history.

Time-space cases are a particularly sensitive type of case for the government, because their setting must leave room for the opposition to defeat the case even if that would go against the historical outcome already known to everyone in the room.

Comedy cases 

Teams occasionally choose to debate very funny or silly topics in rounds.  In this case, the round often becomes a contest over wit and style rather than pure analysis.  “Disneyland should secede from the United States” or something like the following:

“The Federal SNAP program should be replaced with a National Buffet Program where those members of the new improved program shall be granted full and unfettered access to a nationwide chain of all you can eat buffets (with post-meal resting areas) that they may access via a new government issued "buffet" card to promote consumption of prodigious amounts of food and the free and easy movement of cardholders throughout the land." This case was actually proposed, and victorious in the final round of the 1993 University of Pennsylvania Tournament. This is an example of this type of round, which have been known to get quite bizarre.

Numerous cases are run on APDA that do not fit into any of the categories; case construction is a skill that requires significant creativity, and coming up with unique debate topics is a very important skill on the APDA circuit.

History 
While parliamentary debate had been popular in America for some time, there was no proper organization that existed to schedule tournaments, officiate a national championship or resolve disputes. The result was a bizarrely ordered chaos. Following the Glasgow World Championship in 1981, APDA was founded. It has dramatically grown in size since then.  It became an incorporated organization in 2000.

Presidents 
The President is the leader of the Executive Board of APDA, presiding over the Vice President of Operations, Vice President of Finance, and three Members-at-Large. They also serve as the American representative for WUDC. Candidates from various member schools typically declare in the middle of February. Elections are typically held on the final weekend of March annually to elect the Executive Board for the following academic year.

Bo Missonis Award 
This award is given to rising fourth-year debaters who, in the opinion of its prior recipient(s), best represent(s) Bo Missonis. This symbolizes a zest for debate for its own sake accompanied by a certain individuality or style, and in promoting a kind environment for the league. It is awarded to rising seniors so that it may be awarded each year. It is named after Robert "Bo" Missonis.

Chris Porcaro Award 
This award is given to the fourth-year debater with the most top speaker finishes in their APDA career.  It is named after Chris Porcaro, the 1998 APDA speaker of the year, who died of cancer in 2000.

APDA Speakers of the Year
The APDA Speaker of the Year award is presented to the top-ranked individual speaker over the course of the academic year.

Jeff Williams Award 
Created in 2007, the Jeff Williams award is presented to the fourth-year debater who, in the course of their APDA career, has earned the most finishes in the top ten of any OTY category.

Kyle Bean Award
Created in 2016, the Kyle Bean award is presented to the debater or debaters who best embodies the qualities of Kyle Bean, a former Harvard debater who died earlier that season. Those qualities included being welcoming to new debaters, using debate to explore interesting topics, and enjoying debate in a way that makes the activity more fun for everyone else. The award is agnostic to the competitive success of the debater, and instead acknowledges individuals for positive personal contributions to the debate community.

Distinguished Service Award 
The Distinguished Service Award (DSA) is awarded in order to recognize and honor individuals who have delivered outstanding contributions to APDA, parliamentary debate, or the facilitation of public discourse. These contributions may be of any nature, but must be characterized by devotion to APDA and/or its ideals above and beyond that expected of an individual in the position of the honoree.

APDA Teams of the Year 
The APDA Team of the Year award is presented to the top ranked debate partnership over the course of the academic year.

2022 University of Chicago: Robert Brown and Devesh Kodnani 
2021 Amherst: Zan Rozen & Jacob Boehm 
2020 Harvard: Aditya Dhar & Paloma O'Connor 
2019 (Tie) Georgetown: Joe Clancy and Ally Ross, Boston University: Jasper Primack and Teddy Wyman 
2018 Swarthmore: Miriam Pierson and Nathaniel Urban 
2017 Rutgers: Max Albert and Pasha Temkin 
2016 Princeton: Anirudh Dasarathy and Nathan Raab  
2015 Yale: Diana Li and Henry Zhang 
2014 Harvard: Josh Zoffer and Shomik Ghosh 
2013 Yale: Robert Colonel and Ben Kornfeld 
2012 Harvard: Coulter King and Alex Loomis
2011 Boston: Greg Meyer and Alex Taubes
2010 Harvard: Cormac Early and Kyle Bean 
2009 Princeton: Daniel Rauch and Zayn Siddique 
2008 Yale: Josh Bone and Andrew Rohrbach 
2007 Yale: Matthew Wansley and Adam Chilton 
2006 William and Mary: Chris Ford and Robbie Pratt 
2005 (Tie) Harvard: David Vincent Kimel and Jason Wen, Johns Hopkins: Jon Bateman and Michael Mayernick, The College of William and Mary: Chris Ford and Robbie Pratt 
2004 Princeton: Christian Asmar and Kate Reilly 
2003 Yale: Adam Jed and Elizabeth O’Connor
2002 Princeton: Edward Parillon and Yoni Schneller
2001 Yale: Brian Fletcher and Scott Luftglass
2000 Princeton: Laurence Bleicher and David Silverman
1999 Johns Hopkins: Jonathan Cohen and Dave Riordan
1998 Princeton: Jason Goldman and Niall O’Murchadha
1997 Williams: Chris Willenken and Amanda Amert
1996 Stanford: Brendan Maher and Matt Meskell
1995 Columbia: Arlo Devlin-Brown and Dan Stein
1994 Columbia: Thanos Basdekis and Arlo Devlin-Brown
1993 Columbia: Thanos Basdekis and Morty Dubin
1992 Princeton: Ted Cruz and Dave Panton
1991 Yale: David Gray and Austan Goolsbee
1990 Wesleyan: Mark Berkowitz and Dan Prieto
1989 Columbia: Andrew Cohen and Rob Kaplan
1988 University of Maryland, Baltimore County: Greg Ealick and Mark Voyce
1987 Swarthmore: Josh Davis and Reid Neureiter
1985 Princeton:  Chris Alston and Mark Vargo
1984 Princeton: Jim Adams and Peter Shearer
1983 Swarthmore: Grant Oliphant and Chris DeMoulin

APDA National Champions 
2022 Yale: Ben Park and Matt Song 
2021 George Washington: Jared Stone and Nathaniel Sumimoto 
2019 Harvard: Sophia Caldera and John Hunt 
2018 Yale: Jim Huang and Michael Mao 
2017 Swarthmore: Miriam Pierson and William Meyer 
2016 Princeton: Bharath Srivatsan and Sinan Ozbay  
2015 Harvard: Nathaniel Donahue and Fanele Mashwama 
2014 Yale: Michael Barton and Zach Bakal 
2013 Harvard: Ben Sprung-Keyser and Josh Zoffer 
2012 Harvard: Coulter King and Alex Loomis 
2011 Boston University: Greg Meyer and Alex Taubes 
2010 Johns Hopkins: Vivek Suri and Sean Withall
2009 Yale: Andrew Rohrbach and Grant May
2008 Stanford: Michael Baer and Anish Mitra
2007 Yale: David Denton and Dylan Gadek
2006 Princeton: Dan Greco and Michael Reilly
2005 Harvard: Alex Blenkinsopp and Alex Potapov
2004 Harvard: Marty Roth and Nico Cornell
2003 Yale: Jay Cox and Tim Willenken
2002 Princeton: Edward Parillon and Yoni Schneller
2001 Yale: Brian Fletcher and Scott Luftglass
2000 Princeton: Jeremiah Gordon and Matt Schwartz
1999 Columbia: Carissa Byrne and John Castelly
1998 Harvard: Eric Albert and Justin Osofsky
1997 Johns Hopkins:  Rebecca Justice and David Weiner
1996 UPenn: Peter Stris and Elizabeth Rogers [now Brannen]
1995 Swarthmore: Jeremy Mallory and Neal Potischman
1994 Swarthmore: Dave Carney and Neal Potischman
1993 Columbia: Thanos Basdekis and Morty Dubin
1992 Harvard: Chris Harris and David Kennedy
1991 Princeton: Robert Ewing and Christopher Ray
1990 Wesleyan: Andrew Borsanyi and Joel Potischman
1989 Harvard:  Nick Alpers and Pat Bannon
1988 Brown: Aaron Belkin and Jason Grumet
1987 Swarthmore: Josh Davis and Reid Neureiter
1986 Harvard:  Ben Alpers and Michael C. Dorf
1985 Brown: Martha Hirschfield and Tim Moore
1984 United States Naval Academy: Chuck Fish and Marshall Parsons
1983 Harvard:  Neil H. Buchanan and Doug Curtis
1982 Princeton: Robert Gilbert and Richard Sommer
1981 Amherst: J.J. Gertler and Tom Massaro

Evolutionary changes
American parliamentary debate did not begin with APDA.  Three circuits operated in the U.S. prior to its creation, in the Northeast, Midwest, and California.  The University of Chicago tournament was considered the de facto national championship due to its central location and its place as the last tournament on the calendar, and was selected to host the first APDA Nationals in 1981.  APDA started as a way to coordinate tournament schedules among the Northeast schools and to provide a single point of contact for what was then a close working relationship with CUSID.

Tournaments were either five or six rounds, and the length of speeches slightly different from today, at 8, 8, 8, 12, and 4 minutes.  The 12-minute speech by the Opposition could be divided into 8 and 4, in which case the Leader of the Opposition took the Opposition's first 8-minute speech, the Member of the Opposition the second 8, and the leader finished with 4 minutes of pure rebuttal.  The decision on whether to split was tactical, as a strong 12-minute speech could be hard for the Prime Minister to rebut in 4, but a poor one could be disastrous.  Often, the decision to split was made after the Prime Minister's opening speech, when the Opposition had some notion of the strength of the Government case.

Pre- and early-APDA debate style was much closer to CUSID style, with the government required to debate the resolution provided by the tournament organizers. Teams could be creative in using alternative or pun-based definitions for common words used in the original resolution. This was what was originally meant by "squirreling" the resolution. A government could choose to debate "The U.S. should pull out" seriously by defining what the U.S. should pull out of—a foreign entanglement or the United Nations, for example.  It could be squirreled by choosing an uncommon phrase abbreviated U.S. -- the "usual seatbelt" would make it a case against airbags or other passive restraint systems in cars.  Further value was placed on analyzing the underlying core assumptions of a case; in the "usual seatbelt" example, the assumption was that safety should be an individual's personal choice rather than mandated by government.  The best teams were able to argue both the specific case and the general philosophical point.  Cases that seemed to be prepared in advance and linked awkwardly to the resolution were strongly discouraged, and judges were trained to deduct points accordingly.

By about 1987, several factors had led debates to cease relating directly to the resolutions.  Among these were APDA's increasing popularity with debaters accustomed to high school on-topic (NFL or CEDA) formats, a notable incidence of poorly written resolutions that were hard to debate even when squirreled, and the fact that at many schools, the supply of judges willing to sit through training sessions on the fine points of parliamentary style was not sufficient for increasingly larger tournaments.  The result was a rise in prepared cases, a greater emphasis on policy prescriptions and specifics, less-strict adherence to the rules and customs of Parliament, and less opportunity for broad philosophical debate.

While the content of debate rounds has changed significantly, the spirit of today's APDA tournaments is very similar to the original ones, as friendly rivals renew acquaintance every week during the season.

Member organizations

 American University Debate Society
 Amherst Debate Society
 Bates Brooks-Quimby Debate Council
 Boston University Debate Society 
  Brandeis University Mock Trial Association (BUMTA)
 Brown Debating Union 
 Bryn Mawr Parliamentary Debate Society
 Columbia Debate Society 
 Cornell Debate Association 
 Dartmouth College Parliamentary Debate Team 
 Duke Debate 
 Fordham Debate Society 
 Franklin and Marshall Debate Club 
 Georgetown Parliamentary Debate Team 
 George Washington Parliamentary Debate Society 
 Hamilton College
 Harvard Speech and Parliamentary Debate Society
 Haverford College Debate Team 
 Johns Hopkins Undergraduate Debate Council 
 Loyola Marymount
 Massachusetts Institute of Technology Debate Team 
 Middlebury Debate Society 
 Moody Bible Institute Debate Society 
 Mount Holyoke College Debate Society 
 NYU Parliamentary Debate Union 
 Northeastern Debate Society 
 Odette Debate Team 
 Penn Debate Society 
 Princeton Debate Panel 
 Providence College Debate Society
 Rutgers University Debate Union 
 Smith College Debate Society 
 Stanford Debate Society 
 Swarthmore College Amos J. Peaslee Debate Society 
 Temple University Debate Society 
 The College of New Jersey Society for Parliamentary Debate 
 Tufts University Debate Society 
 University of Chicago Chicago Debate Society 
 University of Maryland, College Park Parliamentary Debate Society 
 University of Massachusetts Debate Society 
 University of Pittsburgh Parliamentary Debate Organization 
 University of Virginia 
 Villanova Debate Union 
 Wellesley College Speech and Debate Society 
 Wesleyan University Debate Association 
 West Point
 William & Mary Debate Society 
 Williams Debate Team 
 Yale Debate Association 
 In addition to others not listed

Notable alumni 
 David Frum, Yale Debate Association '82, Conservative commentator and speechwriter to President George W. Bush
 Chris Coons, Amherst Debate Society '85, United States Senator
 David Foster Wallace, Amherst '85, Writer and MacArthur Fellow
 Michael C. Dorf, Harvard '86, American law professor and constitutional law scholar
 Paul Clement, Georgetown '88, Solicitor General of the United States under President George W. Bush, defended the Defense of Marriage Act and opposed the Patient Protection and Affordable Care Act
 Adam Goldstein, MIT '10, co-founder of Hipmunk and BookTour.com
 Dahlia Lithwick, Yale Debate Association '90, journalist on legal issues
 Austan Goolsbee, Yale Debate Association '91, Professor of Economics, University of Chicago and member of President Obama's Council of Economic Advisers
 Ted Cruz, Princeton Debate Panel '92, United States Senator
 Ajit Pai, Harvard '94, Member of the Federal Communications Commission 2012-2021, Chairman, 2017-2021
 John Nicolson, Harvard Speech and Parliamentary Debate Society '84, Former Scottish MP from East Dunbartonshire
Mark Freeman, Harvard Speech and Parliamentary Debate Society '97, Director of the United States Civil Appellate Staff
Julian Sanchez, NYU '02, Senior Fellow at the Cato Institute
Helen Rosner, Smith '04, food correspondent for The New Yorker
Angelo Carusone, Fordham '04, President of Media Matters for America
Stephanos Bibas, Columbia '89, United States circuit judge for the United States Court of Appeals for the Third Circuit
 Sam Reiman, Franklin and Marshall College '02, Director of the Richard King Mellon Foundation

See also 

 Competitive debate in the United States

References

External links 
 

Student debating societies
Youth organizations based in the United States